Lycée La Bourdonnais (LLB) is a French international school in Curepipe, Mauritius. It serves primary school through lycée (senior high school/sixth form).

It was founded in 1953.

References

External links
 Lycée La Bourdonnais
 

French international schools in Mauritius
Curepipe
Educational institutions established in 1953